Unusual Suspects is an American documentary television program on Investigation Discovery. The program debuted on June 21, 2010. It showcases many of the most shocking and difficult cases in law enforcement history, and also sheds light on the investigations that led to the arrest of the culprits. On June 17, 2016, the show was cancelled due to notices of termination by Discovery. In October 2017, the program returned to Investigation Discovery, now with the subtitle Deadly Intent. Although some online sources state that Deadly Intent is the ninth season of the show, Investigation Discovery officially presents it on its website as a new production on its first season.

Episodes

Season 1 (2010)

Season 2 (2011)

Season 3 (2012)

Season 4 (2012)

Season 5 (2013)

Season 6 (2014)

Season 7 (2015)

Season 8 (2016)

References

External links

2010s American documentary television series
2010 American television series debuts
2016 American television series endings
Investigation Discovery original programming
True crime television series